Jamestown Downtown Historic District is a national historic district located at Jamestown in Chautauqua County, New York. The district encompasses 103 contributing buildings in the central business district of Jamestown.   The district developed between about 1873 and 1956, and includes buildings in a variety of architectural styles including Italianate, Gothic Revival, Second Empire, Romanesque Revival, Classical Revival, Renaissance Revival, and Art Deco.  Located in the district is the separately listed Wellman Building. Other notable buildings include the Arcade Building (1898), Odd Fellows Lodge (1914), Bank of Jamestown (1918, 1924), Hotel Samuels (1910), Hotel Jamestown (1924), Chautauqua School of Nursing (1911), Jamestown Telephone Company (1930), Maddox Building (1933), First National Bank (1953), Pennsylvania Gas Company building (ca. 1955), Chautauqua National Bank (1956), Palace Theatre (now the Reg Lenna Center for the Arts, 1923), Allen's Opera House (now Lucille Ball Little Theatre, 1875), and the former Broadhead Worsted Mills (ca. 1870-1888).

It was listed on the National Register of Historic Places in 2014.

References

Historic districts on the National Register of Historic Places in New York (state)
Gothic Revival architecture in New York (state)
Italianate architecture in New York (state)
Second Empire architecture in New York (state)
Neoclassical architecture in New York (state)
Romanesque Revival architecture in New York (state)
Renaissance Revival architecture in New York (state)
Historic districts in Chautauqua County, New York
National Register of Historic Places in Chautauqua County, New York